Mayhill is an unincorporated community in Otero County, New Mexico, United States. It is surrounded by the Lincoln National Forest on the eastern slope of the Sacramento Mountains, at the confluence of James Canyon and Rio Penasco, approximately 17 miles east of Cloudcroft.

Education
It is in within the Cloudcroft Municipal Schools district.

References

Unincorporated communities in New Mexico
Unincorporated communities in Otero County, New Mexico